Jack Henry Stewart Iredale (born 2 May 1996) is a Scotland-born Australian professional footballer who plays as a defender for EFL League One club Bolton Wanderers.

Early life
Iredale was born in Scotland, before moving to New Zealand and then Australia at a young age. He suffered three anterior cruciate ligament injuries playing football between the ages of 15 and 18.

Career
Iredale signed with National Premier Leagues Western Australia side ECU Joondalup in May 2017.

In July 2017, Iredale signed with his hometown club, Scottish Championship side, Greenock Morton. Iredale was nominated for SPFA Goal of the Season for a wonder-strike against Dundee United.

He signed a one-year extension in May 2018.

On 7 May 2019, English League Two side Carlisle United announced that they had signed Iredale on a one year contract for the 2019–20 season.

On 14 August 2020, Iredale signed for Cambridge United. On 4 May 2022, it was announced Iredale would be leaving the club after turning down a new contract.

On 9 May 2022, Iredale signed a three-year contract with Bolton Wanderers, marking their first signing of the transfer window. In January 2023, he was ruled out for the rest of the season due to injury.

Career statistics

References

External links

1996 births
Association football defenders
Australian soccer players
Greenock Morton F.C. players
Living people
National Premier Leagues players
Perth Glory FC players
Queen's Park F.C. players
Carlisle United F.C. players
Cambridge United F.C. players
Bolton Wanderers F.C. players
Scottish footballers
Scottish emigrants to New Zealand
Scottish emigrants to Australia